Vade Retro is a 2017 Brazilian television series created by Fernanda Young and Alexandre Machado. It stars Monica Iozzi and Tony Ramos in the main roles.

Cast 
Monica Iozzi ... Celeste Vasconcelos
Tony Ramos ... Abelardo Zebul (Abel)
Maria Luísa Mendonça ... Lucy Ferguson
Juliano Cazarré ... Davi
Luciana Paes ... Kika
Maria Casadevall ... Lilith
Cecília Homem de Mello	... Leda Vasconcelos
Enrico Baruzzi	... Damien
Nathália Falcão ... Carrie
Pascoal da Conceição ... Padre

Reception

Ratings

References

External links

2017 Brazilian television series debuts
2010s Brazilian television series
Rede Globo original programming
Portuguese-language television shows